Clavus maestratii is a species of sea snail, a marine gastropod mollusc in the family Drilliidae.

Description
The length of the shell attains 11.8 mm, its diameter 4.5 mm.

The shell is shiny and glossy and ranges in color from pale brown or grayish-brown to orange-brown, with the ribs usually being lighter in color.

The shell has a short siphonal canal (a long, narrow tube structure that extends from the opening of the shell) and a slightly contracted opening near its base.

Distribution
This marine species occurs off New Caledonia.

References

 Bouge, L.J. & Dautzenberg, P. ("1913" [1914]) Les Pleurotomes de la Nouvelle-Calédonie et de ses dépendances. Journal de Conchyliologie, 61, 123–214.
  Kilburn R.N., Fedosov A. & Kantor Yu.I. (2014) The shallow-water New Caledonia Drilliidae of genus Clavus Montfort, 1810 (Mollusca: Gastropoda: Conoidea). Zootaxa 3818(1): 1–69

External links

maestratii
Gastropods described in 2014